Big Creek High School was a Grade 9 through 12 public high school located in War, West Virginia. It was operated by the McDowell County Schools and governed by the McDowell County Board of Education. Big Creek High School closed after the 2009–2010 school term and was consolidated with nearby Iaeger High School to form River View High School.

History
Because of delays in construction, the school started the 1931–32 sharing premises at Caretta School. The school opened on January 4, 1932. Initially, there were 205 all-white students with the school becoming fully integrated in 1965. BCHS is constructed in the Collegiate Gothic style and is eligible to be published in the National Register of Historic Places.

The school was closed in 2010 to make way for a consolidated school at Bradshaw, West Virginia, the ground breaking ceremony for which was held on September 21, 2005. Construction began in early 2008.

Also in 2005, a ground breaking ceremony was held on the BCHS football field.  The field was to be converted into a consolidated school of War, Bartley, and Berwind Elementaries.  Although Native American remains from the Late Woodland period were found on the site, the construction continued until April 9, 2007 when the new school, named "Southside" opened.

On July 17, 2015 at around 5:30am, the building caught fire and was burnt severely. The fire occurred during the same week that the building was supposed to be demolished.

Athletics
Big Creek High was the first school in McDowell County and Southern West Virginia and the second in West Virginia to play football after dark after the installation of field lights.

State Titles
Football -
1932(A)

State Finalists
Football -
1952(A), 1976(AA), 1997(A)

Notable alumni
 Bob Gresham, NFL running back
 Homer Hickam, author of Rocket Boys, Vietnam War veteran, retired NASA engineer
 Freida J. Riley, teacher
 Quentin Wilson, engineer
 Rosemary Carucci Goss, university professor

References

External links
 Big Creek High School Alumni Web Site
 Official website of Homer Hickam

Defunct schools in West Virginia
Schools in McDowell County, West Virginia
Educational institutions established in 1932
1932 establishments in West Virginia